Sergei Anatolyevich Chernov (born 2 November 1968) is a former Russian professional football player.

Club career
He played in the Russian Football National League for FC Metallurg Novokuznetsk in 1993.

Honours
 Russian Second Division Zone East top scorer: 1995 (21 goals).

External links
 

1968 births
Living people
Soviet footballers
Russian footballers
Association football midfielders
FC Novokuznetsk players